Group J of the 2014–15 EuroChallenge was the second group of the Last 16 phase. It consisted of JSF Nanterre, Güssing Knights, Le Mans Sarthe Basket, and Uşak Sportif. Play began on 13 January 2015 and ended 24 February.

Standings

References

Group I
2014–15 in French basketball
2014–15 in Austrian basketball
2014–15 in Turkish basketball